The Brunei Rugby Football Union (BRFU; Malay: "Kesatuan Ragbi Brunei Darussalam") is the governing body of rugby union in Brunei.

History
Rugby Union, which is played in 105 countries around the world, has already been played in Brunei since the 1950s. Despite the fact that the Brunei Rugby Football Union has been around since 1977, it was never officially registered with the Registrar of Societies until November 2004.

The Brunei Rugby Football Union is still in its infancy. It registered officially as a society in November 2004, and was admitted into the Asian Rugby Football Union in 2004. It is not yet a member nation of the International Rugby Board.

It administers the Brunei national rugby union team.

See also
 Rugby union in Brunei

External links
 Website

Notes and references

Rugby union in Brunei